He Lifeng (born February 1955) is a Chinese economist and politician who has served as Vice Premier of the People's Republic of China since March 2023 He has additionally been a member of the Politburo of the Chinese Communist Party since October 2022.

Earlier in his career, he worked in Fujian province and Tianjin. He has held a number of significant posts, including Party secretary of Fuzhou, party secretary of Xiamen, party secretary of Binhai New Area, deputy party secretary of Tianijn, Chairman of the Tianjin People's Political Consultative Conference, and, since 2014, a deputy director of the NDRC. He served as 14th Chairman of the National Development and Reform Commission (NDRC) from February 2017 to March 2023.

Early life 
He was born in Yongding County, Fujian into a family whose ancestral roots are usually traced to Xingning, Guangdong. In August 1973 he went to Yongding County as a sent-down youth. In November 1976, he participated in the construction of the Shixiangtan Hydroelectric Dam. After the resumption of the National College Entrance Examination, He gained admission to the Xiamen University school of economics; he studied finance. He obtained a bachelor and a master's degree in 1982 and 1984 respectively, and a Ph.D. degree through part-time studies in 1998. After graduating he began work in Xiamen as a researcher for the special economic zone. In October, he began working for the Xiamen municipal government, beginning his career in politics.

Local careers 
He worked in Fujian province for some 25 years. He worked successively in Xiamen, Quanzhou, Fuzhou. In Xiamen he headed the city's finance department (at the time, Xi Jinping was vice mayor of Xiamen). In 1990 he was promoted to party head of a city district. By February 1995 he was made mayor of Quanzhou, then party secretary. He earned a doctorate in economics at around this time. In April 2000, he became Fuzhou party secretary, by December 2001, he joined the Fujian provincial Party Standing Committee. In May 2005 he was named party secretary of Xiamen.

In May 2009, he was transferred to Tianjin to become deputy party secretary of the municipality, the head of the working committee of Binhai New Area, and the party secretary of Tanggu District. In January 2013, he was named chairman of the Tianjin People's Political Consultative Conference.

National career 
In June 2014 he was named deputy Party Branch Secretary of the National Development and Reform Commission and also deputy director (minister-level). Since then He has emerged as one of the chief figures in charge of advancing economic reform policies.

In February 2017 he was appointed as the Chairman of the National Development and Reform Commission by the Standing Committee of the National People's Congress.

He was an alternate member of the 17th and the 18th Central Committee of the Chinese Communist Party, and a full member of the 19th Central Committee of the Chinese Communist Party.

After the 20th Party National Congress, he was elected as a member of the CCP Politburo. On 12 March 2023, he was appointed as a vice premier of the People's Republic of China.

References 

1955 births
Living people
People's Republic of China politicians from Guangdong
Chinese Communist Party politicians from Guangdong
People from Xingning
Politicians from Meizhou
Alternate members of the 17th Central Committee of the Chinese Communist Party
Alternate members of the 18th Central Committee of the Chinese Communist Party
Members of the 19th Central Committee of the Chinese Communist Party
Members of the 20th Politburo of the Chinese Communist Party
Delegates to the 9th National People's Congress
Members of the 12th Chinese People's Political Consultative Conference
Vice Chairpersons of the National Committee of the Chinese People's Political Consultative Conference
Xiamen University alumni
Vice Premiers of the People's Republic of China